Cotești is a commune located in Vrancea County, Romania. It is composed of four villages: Budești, Cotești, Goleștii de Sus and Valea Cotești.

Natives
 G. M. Vlădescu

References

Communes in Vrancea County
Localities in Muntenia